Mladen Lambulić (born 9 July 1972) is a Montenegrin football manager and former player.

Playing career
Lambulić played for Radnički Beograd and Zemun in the First League of FR Yugoslavia, before moving abroad to Belgium and signing with Denderleeuw in 1999. He subsequently returned to FR Yugoslavia and joined his mother club Zeta in 2000. During the 2002 winter transfer window, Lambulić moved abroad for the second time and signed with Hungarian side MTK Budapest. He spent the next seven and a half years with the club, winning the Nemzeti Bajnokság I in the 2007–08 season.

Managerial career
After hanging up his boots, Lambulić started his managerial career at Zeta in 2014.

Honours
MTK Budapest
 Nemzeti Bajnokság I: 2007–08
 Szuperkupa: 2008

References

External links

 
 

1972 births
Living people
Footballers from Podgorica
Serbia and Montenegro footballers
Montenegrin footballers
Association football defenders
FK Radnički Beograd players
FK Zemun players
FK Zeta players
MTK Budapest FC players
FC Sopron players
Újpest FC players
Kecskeméti TE players
First League of Serbia and Montenegro players
Challenger Pro League players
Nemzeti Bajnokság I players
Serbia and Montenegro expatriate footballers
Montenegrin expatriate footballers
Expatriate footballers in Belgium
Expatriate footballers in Hungary
Serbia and Montenegro expatriate sportspeople in Belgium
Serbia and Montenegro expatriate sportspeople in Hungary
Montenegrin expatriate sportspeople in Hungary
Montenegrin football managers
FK Zeta managers
FK Jedinstvo Bijelo Polje managers
OFK Petrovac managers